The Bednja is a river in northern Croatia, a right tributary of the Drava.
The Bednja rises in the mountainous forested areas near Macelj in northern Croatia, west of Trakošćan, where it also forms a  lake at 255 m.a.s.l.
It flows towards the southeast until turning east near Bednja, meandering south at Novi Marof, returning to its eastward course shortly thereafter, and then turning northeast toward Ludbreg.

It was called "Serapia" in antiquity. The name "Serapia" is supposed to come from Proto-Indo-European words *ser (to flow) and *h2ep (water).

References

Rivers of Croatia